WSLX (91.9 FM) is a non-commercial high school radio station licensed to serve New Canaan, Connecticut.  The station is owned by St. Luke's School in the same town and licensed to the St. Luke's Foundation, Inc.  It airs a Variety music format.

The station was assigned the WSLX call letters by the Federal Communications Commission.

References

External links
WSLX official website

SLX
High school radio stations in the United States
New Canaan, Connecticut
Radio stations established in 1985
1985 establishments in Connecticut